Deutsche Schule San Alberto Magno S. Coop is a German international school in San Sebastián, Spain. It serves levels kindergarten through oberstufe (bachillerato/batxilergoa).

References

External links
  Deutsche Schule San Alberto Magno
  Deutsche Schule San Alberto Magno
  Deutsche Schule San Alberto Magno

Education in the Basque Country (autonomous community)
Buildings and structures in Gipuzkoa
German international schools in Spain